Zhang Siyang (born 4 February 2005) is a Chinese pair skater who currently competes with Yang Yongchao. She is the 2022 Chinese nationals pairs skating champion.  Originally as a singles skater, she switched to pairs in the 2022/23 skating season.

Programs

With Yang

As a singles skater

Competitive highlights

As a pairs team with Yang Yongchao
GP: Grand Prix; CS: Challenger Series; JGP: Junior Grand Prix

As a singles skater 
GP: Grand Prix; CS: Challenger Series; JGP: Junior Grand Prix

References

Living people
2005 births